The  or  was one of the most sacred and traditional rites of Roman religion: the sacrifice of a pig, a sheep and a bull to the deity Mars to bless and purify land.

Summary 
There were two kinds:
  ("suckling suovetaurilia") of a male pig, a lamb and a calf, for purifying private fields
  ("greater suovtaurilia") of a boar, a ram and a bull, for public ceremonies.

The ritual for private fields is preserved in Cato the Elder's , "On Agriculture".  The first step was to lead the three animals around the boundaries of the land to be blessed, pronouncing the following words:

"That with the good help of the gods success may crown our work, I bid thee, Manius, to take care to purify my farm, my land, my ground with this suovetaurilia, in whatever part thou thinkest best for them to be driven or carried around."

"Manius" in this passage may be an obscure minor deity, related to the Manes, or may be the equivalent of English John Doe.  Then, before the sacrifice is performed, the following prayer to Mars must be made:

"Father Mars, I pray and beseech thee that thou be gracious and merciful to me, my house, and my household; to which intent I have bidden this suovetaurilia to be led around my land, my ground, my farm; that thou keep away, ward off, and remove sickness, seen and unseen, barrenness and destruction, ruin and unseasonable influence; and that thou permit my harvests, my grain, my vineyards, and my plantations to flourish and to come to good issue, preserve in health my shepherds and my flocks, and give good health and strength to me, my house, and my household. To this intent, to the intent of purifying my farm, my land, my ground, and of making an expiation, as I have said, deign to accept the offering of these suckling victims; Father Mars, to the same intent deign to accept the offering of these suckling offering."

The original Latin of this prayer is crudely metrical and incantatory; even in Old Latin, the prayer contains many rhetorical figures such as alliteration and liberal use of merisms and antithesis.  It illustrates the sing-song, metrical, and poetic format of polytheistic prayers.  Cakes of bread were sacrificed along with the three animals.  At the moment the sacrifices were made, the landowner was to say:

"To this intent deign to accept the offering of these victims."

If favourable omens as a response to the sacrifice were not forthcoming, the landowner was instructed to redo the sacrifice and offer a further prayer:

"Father Mars, if aught hath not pleased thee in the offering of those sucklings, I make atonement with these victims."

If only one or two of the omens expected after the three sacrifices failed to appear, the landowner was instructed to offer an additional swine, saying:

"Father Mars, inasmuch as thou wast not pleased by the offering of that pig, I make atonement with this pig."

The nature of the expected omens is not given by Cato. The omens, however, were likely determined by the art of haruspicy, the examination of the entrails, and especially the livers, of sacrificed animals for divinatory signs. Public  were offered at certain state ceremonies, including agricultural festivals, the conclusion of a census, and to atone for any accidental ritual errors.

If a temple were destroyed, the site of the temple must be purified by a  before a new temple could be reconstructed on the site. A public  was also offered to bless the army before a major military campaign. A suovetaurilia is shown on the right hand panel of The Bridgeness Slab. It was suggested that the sacrifice might have been made at the start of the building of the Antonine Wall.

Parallels
Some religious rites similar to the Roman suovetaurilia were practiced by a few other Indo-European peoples, from Iberia to India. The Cabeço das Fráguas inscript (found in Portugal) describes a threefold sacrifice practiced by the Lusitanians, devoting a sheep, a pig and a bull to what may have been local gods. In the Indian Sautramani, a ram, a bull and a goat were sacrificed to Indra Sutraman; in Iran ten thousand sheep, a thousand cattle and a hundred stallions were dedicated to Ardvi Sura Anahita. Similar to the above rituals is the Greek , the oldest known being described in the Odyssey and dedicated to Poseidon. The philosopher and historian Plutarch related in the Lives Of The Noble Greeks And Romans a story from the life of Pyrrhus about the sacrifice of a ram, a pig and a bull. The Umbrian Iguvine Tables also describe a sacrificial ritual related to the aforementioned rites.

References

Bibliography
Watkins, Calvert. How to Kill a Dragon: Aspects of Indo-European Poetics (Oxford, 2001)

External links
Cato the Elder: On Agriculture (from Lacus Curtius)

Roman animal sacrifice
Mars (mythology)
Cattle in religion
Pigs
Sheep